is an underground metro station located in Naka-ku, Nagoya, Aichi Prefecture, Japan operated by the Nagoya Municipal Subway. The station is an interchange station between the Tsurumai Line and the Higashiyama Line, and is located 7.0 rail kilometers from the terminus of the Tsurumai Line at Kami-Otai Station and 8.0 rail kilometers from the terminus of the Higashiyama Line at Takabata Station.

History
It was renamed to its present name on 1 June 1966. The Tsurumai Line connected to the station on 18 March 1977.

Lines

 (Station number: H09)
 (Station number: T07)

Layout
Fushimi Station has two pair of underground opposed side platforms, built on different levels.

Platforms

There are three wickets, the North Wicket, Central Wicket, and South Wicket.

References

External links

 Fushimi Station official web site 

Railway stations in Japan opened in 1957
Railway stations in Aichi Prefecture
Sakae, Nagoya